Athena is a city in Umatilla County, Oregon, United States. The population was 1,126 at the 2010 census. It is part of the Hermiston-Pendleton Micropolitan Statistical Area.

History
Athena, about halfway between Pendleton, Oregon, and Walla Walla, Washington, was originally called Centerville. However, confusion about the name sometimes arose because Oregon had another Centerville, in Washington County, and the state of Washington had a Centerville, in Klickitat County. In 1889, local government officials asked the Centerville school principal, D. W. Jarvis, to recommend a different name. He chose Athena after the Greek goddess, and they agreed.

Centerville got its first post office on October 11, 1878. The first postmaster was William T. Cook. The post office name was changed to Athena on May 16, 1889.

Nineteenth-century settlers of Scottish descent brought to Athena an interest in the customs and music of Scotland. Before World War I, Athena had a Caledonian Society that held an annual picnic featuring Scottish dancing and bagpipes. Weston-McEwen High School in Athena revived the tradition in the 1950s when it organized a Scots dance group and a pipe band. The band has since performed at many venues in the United States and has traveled to Scotland and England to play.

Athena was also a filming location in the 1930 F.W. Murnau film "City Girl" starring Charles Farrell and Mary Duncan.

The city of Athena was born on Scottish heritage and wants to keep the history and culture alive in the small rural town. Every July the city hosts the Caledonian games. This event hosts food venues, picnic, and a wide variety of games that are common in Scottish heritage. The event  holds "Scottish heritage and athletes competing in events based on historic farm skills."

Geography

Climate
According to the Köppen Climate Classification system, Athena has a warm-summer Mediterranean climate, abbreviated "Csa" on climate maps.

Demographics

2010 census
As of the census of 2010, there were 1,126 people, 446 households, and 325 families residing in the city. The racial makeup of the city was 91.4% White, 0.4% African American, 3.0% Native American, 0.4% Asian, 2.8% from other races, and 2.0% from two or more races. Hispanic or Latino of any race were 4.5% of the population.

There were 446 households, of which 33.6% had children under the age of 18 living with them, 56.1% were married couples living together, 12.1% had a female householder with no husband present, 4.7% had a male householder with no wife present, and 27.1% were non-families. 23.3% of all households were made up of individuals, and 9.4% had someone living alone who was 65 years of age or older. The average household size was 2.52 and the average family size was 2.91.

The median age in the city was 41.6 years. 25% of residents were under the age of 18; 7.3% were between the ages of 18 and 24; 22.2% were from 25 to 44; 29.2% were from 45 to 64; and 16.3% were 65 years of age or older. The gender makeup of the city was 48.0% male and 52.0% female.

2000 census
As of the census of 2000, there were 1,221 people, 446 households, and 341 families residing in the city. The population density was 2,152.5 people per square mile (827.1/km2). There were 473 housing units at an average density of 833.8 per square mile (320.4/km2). The racial makeup of the city was 90.17% White, 3.69% Native American, 0.16% Asian, 0.08% Pacific Islander, 3.60% from other races, and 2.29% from two or more races. Hispanic or Latino of any race were 5.16% of the population.

There were 446 households, out of which 40.6% had children under the age of 18 living with them, 61.4% were married couples living together, 10.8% had a female householder with no husband present, and 23.5% were non-families. 20.0% of all households were made up of individuals, and 11.0% had someone living alone who was 65 years of age or older. The average household size was 2.74 and the average family size was 3.15.

In the city, the population was spread out, with 31.5% under the age of 18, 5.4% from 18 to 24, 27.3% from 25 to 44, 23.1% from 45 to 64, and 12.7% who were 65 years of age or older. The median age was 35 years. For every 100 females, there were 95.7 males. For every 100 females age 18 and over, there were 92.2 males.

The median income for a household in the city was $36,875, and the median income for a family was $40,234. Males had a median income of $30,323 versus $20,598 for females. The per capita income for the city was $15,566. About 10.5% of families and 12.0% of the population were below the poverty line, including 15.3% of those under age 18 and 9.3% of those age 65 or over.

Education

Athena is served by the Athena Weston School District.

Industry
Hodaka motorcycles were once designed in Athena under the aegis of the Pacific Basin Trading Company, with manufacture in Japan.  The Hodaka marque is recognized as an American vintage cycle; it was the vintage marque at the 2006 American Motorcyclist Association (AMA) Vintage Motorcycle Days at Mid-Ohio. Reunions of former PABATCO employees, vintage enthusiasts, and present-day Hodaka owners and riders are held in Athena annually, including swap meet, bike show, scrambles, and observed trials.

References

Further reading
Athena Press, issues archived at the Athena library.
Gaston, Joseph, Centennial History of Oregon, Chicago: SJ Clarke Publishing, 1912.
Geissel, Genevieve and Mildred Miley, "Athena, Once Centerville, Has Interesting History", Umatilla County Historical Society Pioneer Trails, V2, no.3, April 1978.
Gilbert, Frank T., Historic Sketches, Portland, Oregon: AG Walling Printing, 1882.

External links

Entry for Athena in the Oregon Blue Book

Cities in Oregon
Cities in Umatilla County, Oregon
Pendleton–Hermiston Micropolitan Statistical Area
1904 establishments in Oregon
Populated places established in 1904